The Salaca is a river in northern Latvia. It flows from Lake Burtnieks in Vidzeme, 90 km, to the Gulf of Riga. The river flows through three towns, Mazsalaca, Staicele and Salacgrīva. The riverbanks feature Devonian red sandstone cliffs, and many caves and rapids as well. Salaca is the best salmon river in Latvia and one of the best in Baltics.

References

External links
 

Rivers of Estonia
Rivers of Latvia
Gulf of Riga
Drainage basins of the Baltic Sea
International rivers of Europe